Planovalvata is a genus of moths in the family Erebidae described by Vladimir V. Dubatolov and Yasunori Kishida in 2012. It contains only one species, Planovalvata roseivena, which was described by George Hampson in 1894. It is found in Myanmar.

References

Moths described in 1894
Lithosiini
Monotypic moth genera
Moths of Asia